The 1973 Hamilton Tiger-Cats season was the 16th season for the team in the Canadian Football League and their 24th overall. The Tiger-Cats finished in 4th place in the Eastern Conference with a 7–7 record and missed the playoffs for only the second time since the inception of the Tiger-Cats in 1950. In May 1973 the club was sold to Mr. Michael G. DeGroote, chairman and chief executive officer of Laidlaw Transportation Limited.

Roster

Regular season

Season standings

Season schedule

References

Hamilton Tiger-cats Season, 1973
Hamilton Tiger-Cats seasons
1973 Canadian Football League season by team